Palm Beach is an unincorporated community in northern Illinois, United States. It lies in Lake and McHenry counties at the southern end of Pistakee Lake.

References

Unincorporated communities in Lake County, Illinois
Unincorporated communities in McHenry County, Illinois
Unincorporated communities in Illinois